The 1981 Irish hunger strike was the culmination of a five-year protest during the Troubles by Irish republican prisoners in Northern Ireland. The protest began as the blanket protest in 1976, when the British government withdrew Special Category Status (prisoner of war rather than criminal status, in 1972 the then Labour government compromised and granted Special Category Prisoner, which was basically POW status without the name) for convicted paramilitary prisoners. In 1978, the dispute escalated into the dirty protest, where prisoners refused to leave their cells to wash and covered the walls of their cells with excrement. In 1980, seven prisoners participated in the first hunger strike, which ended after 53 days.

The second hunger strike took place in 1981 and was a showdown between the prisoners and the Prime Minister, Margaret Thatcher. One hunger striker, Bobby Sands, was elected as a member of parliament during the strike, prompting media interest from around the world. The strike was called off after ten prisoners had starved themselves to death, including Sands, whose funeral was attended by 100,000 people. The strike radicalised Irish nationalist politics and was the driving force that enabled Sinn Féin to become a mainstream political party.

Background 

The use of a hunger strike as a means of protest in Ireland is a tradition dating to pre-Christian times. In the 20th century there had been hunger strikes by Irish republican prisoners since 1917, twelve men died on hunger strike prior to the 1981 strikes: Thomas Ashe (1917), Terence MacSwiney (1920), Michael Fitzgerald (1920), Joe Murphy (1920), Joseph Whitty (1923), Andy O'Sullivan (1923), Denny Barry (1923), Tony D'Arcy (1940), Jack McNeela (1940), Seán McCaughey (1946), Michael Gaughan (1974) and Frank Stagg (1976). 

After the introduction of internment in 1971, Long Kesh—later known as HM Prison Maze—was run like a prisoner of war camp. Internees lived in dormitories and disciplined themselves with military-style command structures, drilled with dummy guns made from wood, and held lectures on guerrilla warfare and politics. Convicted prisoners were refused the same rights as internees until July 1972, when Special Category Status was introduced following a hunger strike by 40 Provisional Irish Republican Army (IRA) prisoners led by the veteran republican Billy McKee. Special Category, or political status meant prisoners were treated similarly to prisoners of war; for example, not having to wear prison uniforms or do prison work. On 1 March 1976, Merlyn Rees, the Secretary of State for Northern Ireland in the Wilson ministry, announced that paramilitary prisoners would no longer be entitled to Special Category Status. The policy was not introduced for existing prisoners, but for those convicted of offences after 1 March 1976. The end to Special Category Status was a serious threat to the authority which the paramilitary leaderships inside prison had been able to exercise over their own men, as well as being a propaganda blow.

Blanket and dirty protests 

On 14 September 1976, newly convicted prisoner Kieran Nugent began the blanket protest, in which IRA and Irish National Liberation Army (INLA) prisoners refused to wear prison uniforms and either went naked or fashioned garments from prison blankets. In 1978, after a number of clashes between prison officers and prisoners leaving their cells to wash and "slop out" (empty their chamber pots), this escalated into the dirty protest, where prisoners refused to wash and smeared their excrement on the walls of their cells. These protests aimed to re-establish their political status by securing what were known as the "Five Demands":

 the right not to wear a prison uniform;
 the right not to do prison work;
 the right of free association with other prisoners, and to organise educational and recreational pursuits;
 the right to one visit, one letter and one parcel per week;
 full restoration of remission lost through the protest.

Initially, this protest did not attract a great deal of attention, and even the IRA regarded it as a side-issue compared to their armed campaign. It began to attract attention when Tomás Ó Fiaich, the Roman Catholic Archbishop of Armagh, visited the prison and condemned the conditions there. In 1979, former MP Bernadette McAliskey stood in the election for the European Parliament on a platform of support for the protesting prisoners, and won 5.9% of the vote across Northern Ireland, even though Sinn Féin had called for a boycott of the election.

Shortly after this, the broad-based National H-Block/Armagh Committee was formed, on a platform of support for the "Five Demands", with McAliskey as its main spokesperson. The period leading up to the hunger strike saw assassinations by both republicans and loyalists.  The IRA shot and killed a number of prison officers, while loyalist paramilitaries shot and killed a number of activists in the National H-Block/Armagh Committee and badly injured McAliskey and her husband in an attempt on their lives.

1980 hunger strike 
On 27 October 1980, republican prisoners in HM Prison Maze began a hunger strike. One hundred and forty-eight prisoners volunteered to be part of the strike, but a total of seven were selected to match the number of men who signed the Easter 1916 Proclamation of the Republic. The group consisted of IRA members Brendan Hughes, Tommy McKearney, Raymond McCartney, Tom McFeely, Sean McKenna, Leo Green, and INLA member John Nixon.

On 1 December three prisoners in Armagh Women's Prison joined the strike, including Mairéad Farrell, followed by a short-lived hunger strike by several dozen more prisoners in HM Prison Maze. In a war of nerves between the IRA leadership and the British government, with McKenna lapsing in and out of a coma and on the brink of death, the government appeared to concede the essence of the prisoners' five demands with a thirty-page document detailing a proposed settlement. With the document in transit to Belfast, Hughes took the decision to save McKenna's life and end the strike after 53 days on 18 December.

1981 hunger strike 

In January 1981, it became clear that the prisoners' demands had not been conceded. Prison authorities began to supply the prisoners with officially issued civilian clothing, whereas the prisoners demanded the right to wear their own clothing. On 4 February, the prisoners issued a statement saying that the British government had failed to resolve the crisis and declared their intention of "hunger striking once more". The second hunger strike began on 1 March, when Bobby Sands, the IRA's former officer commanding (OC) in the prison, refused food. A statement from the prisoners was issued by Danny Morrison:

We have asserted that we are political prisoners and everything about our country, our arrests, interrogations, trials and prison conditions, show that we are politically motivated and not motivated by selfish reasons or for selfish ends. As further demonstration of our selflessness and the justness of our cause a number of our comrades, beginning today with Bobby Sands, will hunger-strike to the death unless the British government abandons its criminalization policy and meets our demand for political status.

Unlike the first strike, the prisoners joined one at a time and at staggered intervals, which they believed would arouse maximum public support and exert maximum pressure on Prime Minister Margaret Thatcher. The republican movement initially struggled to generate public support for the second hunger strike. The Sunday before Sands began his strike, 3,500 people marched through west Belfast. During the first hunger strike four months earlier the marchers had numbered 10,000. Five days into the strike, Independent Republican MP for Fermanagh and South Tyrone Frank Maguire died, resulting in a by-election. There was debate among nationalists and republicans regarding who should contest the election: Austin Currie of the Social Democratic and Labour Party expressed an interest, as did Bernadette McAliskey and Maguire's brother Noel.

After negotiations they agreed not to split the nationalist vote by contesting the election and Sands stood as an Anti H-Block candidate against Ulster Unionist Party candidate Harry West. Following a high-profile campaign the election took place on 9 April, and Sands was elected to the British House of Commons with 30,492 votes to West's 29,046.

Sands' election victory raised hopes that a settlement could be negotiated, but Thatcher stood firm in refusing to give concessions to the hunger strikers. She stated "We are not prepared to consider special category status for certain groups of people serving sentences for crime. Crime is crime is crime, it is not political". The world's media descended on Belfast, and several intermediaries visited Sands in an attempt to negotiate an end to the hunger strike, including Síle de Valera, granddaughter of Éamon de Valera, Pope John Paul II's personal envoy John Magee, and European Commission of Human Rights officials. With Sands close to death, the government's position remained unchanged, with Secretary of State for Northern Ireland Humphrey Atkins stating "If Mr. Sands persisted in his wish to commit suicide, that was his choice. The Government would not force medical treatment upon him".

Deaths and end of strike

On 5 May, Sands died in the prison hospital on the 66th day of his hunger strike, prompting rioting in nationalist areas of Northern Ireland. Humphrey Atkins issued a statement saying that Sands had committed suicide "under the instructions of those who felt it useful to their cause that he should die". More than 100,000 people lined the route of his funeral, which was conducted with full IRA military honours. Margaret Thatcher showed no sympathy for his death, telling the House of Commons that "Mr. Sands was a convicted criminal. He chose to take his own life. It was a choice that his organisation did not allow to many of its victims".

In the two weeks following Sands' death, three more hunger strikers died. Francis Hughes died on 12 May, resulting in further rioting in nationalist areas of Northern Ireland, in particular Derry and Belfast. Following the deaths of Raymond McCreesh and Patsy O'Hara on 21 May, Tomás Ó Fiaich, by then Primate of All Ireland, criticised the British government's handling of the hunger strike. Despite this, Thatcher continued to refuse to negotiate a settlement, stating "Faced with the failure of their discredited cause, the men of violence have chosen in recent months to play what may well be their last card", during a visit to Belfast in late May.

Nine protesting prisoners contested the general election in the Republic of Ireland in June. Kieran Doherty and Paddy Agnew (who was not on hunger strike) were elected in Cavan–Monaghan and Louth respectively, and Joe McDonnell narrowly missed election in Sligo–Leitrim. There were also local elections in Northern Ireland on 20 May, although Sinn Féin did not contest them. Some smaller groups and independents who supported the hunger strikers gained seats, such as the Irish Independence Party with 21 seats, while the Irish Republican Socialist Party (the INLA's political wing) and People's Democracy (a Trotskyist group) gained two seats each, and a number of pro-hunger strike independent candidates also won seats. The British government passed the Representation of the People Act 1981 to prevent another prisoner contesting the second by-election in Fermanagh and South Tyrone, which was due to take place following the death of Sands. On 4 July the prisoners stated they were not asking for preferential treatment, saying "We would warmly welcome the introduction of the Five Demands for all prisoners".

Following the deaths of Joe McDonnell and Martin Hurson, the families of some of the hunger strikers attended a meeting on 28 July with Catholic priest Father Denis Faul. The families expressed concern at the lack of a settlement to the priest, and a decision was made to meet with Gerry Adams later that day. At the meeting Father Faul put pressure on Adams to find a way of ending the strike, and Adams agreed to ask the IRA leadership to order the men to end the hunger strike. The following day Adams held a meeting with six of the hunger strikers to outline a proposed settlement on offer from the British government should the strike be brought to an end. The six men rejected the settlement, believing that accepting anything less than the "Five Demands" would be a betrayal of the sacrifice made by Bobby Sands and the other hunger strikers who had died.

On 31 July, the hunger strike began to break, when the mother of Paddy Quinn insisted on medical intervention to save his life. The following day Kevin Lynch died, followed by Kieran Doherty on 2 August, Thomas McElwee on 8 August and Michael Devine on 20 August. On the day Devine died, Sands' election agent Owen Carron won the Fermanagh and South Tyrone by-election with an increased number of votes.

On 6 September, the family of Laurence McKeown became the fourth family to intervene and asked for medical treatment to save his life, and Cahal Daly issued a statement calling on prisoners to end the hunger strike. A week later, James Prior replaced Humphrey Atkins as Secretary of State for Northern Ireland, and met with prisoners in an attempt to end the strike. Liam McCloskey ended his strike on 26 September after his family said they would ask for medical intervention if he became unconscious, and it became clear that the families of the remaining hunger strikers would also intervene to save their lives.

The strike was called off at 3:15 pm on 3 October. Three days later, Prior announced partial concessions to the prisoners including the right to wear their own clothes at all times. The only one of the "Five Demands" still outstanding was the right not to do prison work. Following sabotage by the prisoners and the Maze Prison escape in 1983, the prison workshops were closed, effectively granting all of the "Five Demands" but without any formal recognition of political status from the government.

Participants who died on hunger strike 

The original pathologist's report recorded the hunger strikers' cause of death as "self-imposed starvation". This was later amended to simply "starvation", after protests from the dead strikers' families. The coroner recorded verdicts of "starvation, self-imposed".

Other participants in the hunger strike 
Although ten men died during the course of the hunger strike, thirteen others began refusing food but were taken off hunger strike, either due to medical reasons or after intervention by their families. Many of them still suffer from the effects of the strike, with problems including digestive, visual, physical and neurological disabilities.

Impact of the hunger strike 

The British press hailed the hunger strike as a triumph for Thatcher, with The Guardian newspaper stating "The Government had overcome the hunger strikes by a show of resolute determination not to be bullied". At the time most thought the hunger strike a crushing defeat for the republicans, a view shared by many within the IRA and Sinn Féin, but Sands' by-election win was a propaganda victory, and the hunger strike became a Pyrrhic victory for Thatcher and the British government. Sands became a martyr to Irish republicans, while Thatcher became a republican hate figure of Cromwellian proportions, with Danny Morrison describing her as "the biggest bastard we have ever known".

As with internment in 1971 and Bloody Sunday in 1972, IRA recruitment was boosted, resulting in a new surge of paramilitary activity. There was an upsurge of violence after the comparatively quiet years of the late 1970s, with widespread civil disorder in Northern Ireland and rioting outside the British Embassy in Dublin. Security forces fired 29,695 plastic bullets in 1981, causing seven deaths, compared to a total of around 16,000 bullets and four deaths in the eight years following the hunger strikes.

The IRA continued its armed campaign during the seven months of the strike, killing 13 policemen, 13 soldiers, including five members of the Ulster Defence Regiment and five civilians.  The seven months were one of the bloodiest periods of the Troubles with a total of 61 people killed, 34 of them civilians. Three years later the IRA tried to take their revenge on Thatcher with the Brighton hotel bombing, an attack on the Conservative party conference that killed five people and in which Thatcher herself only narrowly escaped death.

The hunger strike prompted Sinn Féin to move towards electoral politics. Sands' election victory, combined with that of pro-hunger strike candidates in the Northern Ireland local elections and Dáil elections in the Republic of Ireland, gave birth to the Armalite and ballot box strategy. Gerry Adams remarked that Sands' victory "exposed the lie that the hunger strikers—and by extension the IRA and the whole republican movement—had no popular support". The election victories of Doherty and Agnew also had political impact in the Republic of Ireland, as they denied power to Charles Haughey's outgoing Fianna Fáil government. In 1982 Sinn Féin won five seats in the elections to the Northern Ireland Assembly, and in 1983 Gerry Adams won a seat in the UK general election. As a result of the political base built during the hunger strike, Sinn Féin continued to grow in the following two decades. After the 2001 United Kingdom general election, it became the largest nationalist party in Northern Ireland.

In 2005, the role of Gerry Adams was questioned by former prisoner Richard O'Rawe, who was the public relations officer inside the prison during the strike. O'Rawe states in his book Blanketmen that Adams prolonged the strike as it was of great political benefit to Sinn Féin and allowed Owen Carron to win Sands' seat. This was denied by several hunger strikers and Brendan McFarlane, who was OC inside the prison during the hunger strike. McFarlane states O'Rawe's version of events is confused and fragmentary, and states "We were desperate for a solution. Any deal that went some way to meeting the five demands would have been taken. If it was confirmed in writing, we'd have grabbed it ... There was never a deal, there was never a "take it or leave it" option at all".

Commemorations 

There are memorials and murals in memory of the hunger strikers in towns and cities across Ireland, including Belfast, Dublin, Derry, Crossmaglen and Camlough. Annual commemorations take place across Ireland for each man who died on the hunger strike, and an annual hunger strike commemoration march is held in Belfast each year, which includes a Bobby Sands memorial lecture. Several towns and cities in France have named streets after Bobby Sands, including Paris and Le Mans. The government in Tehran, Iran, changed the name of the street on which the British embassy was located to Bobby Sands, from its previous name, Churchill Street. The embassy subsequently changed its mailing address to refer to an entrance door around the corner from the main entrance, to avoid having to use the name of Bobby Sands on their letterhead.

A memorial to the men who died in the Irish Rebellion of 1798, the Easter Rising and the hunger strike stands in Waverley Cemetery, Sydney, Australia, which is also the burial place of Michael Dwyer of the Society of United Irishmen. In 1997 NORAID's Hartford Unit in the United States dedicated a monument to Bobby Sands and the other hunger strikers. The monument is a granite Celtic cross standing in a traffic roundabout renamed "Bobby Sands Circle" in 1995. On 3 October 2001—the 20th anniversary of the end of the hunger strike—a  memorial was unveiled by Gerry Adams, Patrick Sheehan and Ahmed Kathrada, on Robben Island, South Africa.

On 20 March 2001 Sinn Féin's national chairperson Mitchel McLaughlin opened the National Hunger Strike Commemoration Committee's exhibition at the Europa Hotel in Belfast, which included three original works of art from Belfast-based artists. A separate exhibition was also launched in Derry the following month. Numerous films have been made based on the events of the hunger strike, including Some Mother's Son starring Helen Mirren, H3 (which was co-written by former hunger striker Laurence McKeown), and Steve McQueen's Hunger.

Notes

References

External links 

 Bobby Sands Trust
 Stailc 81

 
Hunger strike
1981 protests
Hunger strikes
Hunger strike
Hunger strike
Hunger strike
Hunger strike